Mill at Lobachsville is a historic grist mill complex located in Pike Township, Berks County, Pennsylvania.  The complex consists of the three-story, stone-and-frame banked mill with corrugated steel gable roof (1887); -story, stone-and-frame farmhouse (c. 1745); -story, stone settler's cabin dated to the 18th century; one-story, frame summer kitchen; one-story, frame ice house; one-story, frame wagon shed; two-story, stone-and-frame barn (1814); one seat privy; stone-and-frame pig sty; and the millraces and pond. The mill ceased operation in 1965. The custom mill was built as part of a working farm.

It was listed on the National Register of Historic Places in 1990.

References

Grinding mills in Berks County, Pennsylvania
Grinding mills on the National Register of Historic Places in Pennsylvania
Houses completed in 1745
Industrial buildings completed in 1887
Houses in Berks County, Pennsylvania
National Register of Historic Places in Berks County, Pennsylvania
1745 establishments in Pennsylvania